Gopalpur is an upazila of Tangail District in the Division of Dhaka, Bangladesh.

Geography
It has a total area of 193.37 km2.

Demographics

According to the 2011 Bangladesh census, Gopalpur Upazila had 63,976 households and a population of 252,331, 20.3% of whom lived in urban areas. 9.5% of the population was under the age of 5. The literacy rate (age 7 and over) was 45.7%, compared to the national average of 51.8%.

Administration
Gopalpur Upazila is divided into Gopalpur Municipality and seven union parishads: Alamnagar, Dhopakandi, Hadira, Hemnagar, Jhawail, Mirzapur, and Nagda Simla. The union parishads are subdivided into 111 mauzas and 158 villages.

Gopalpur Municipality is subdivided into 9 wards and 35 mahallas.

See also
Gopalpur
Upazilas of Bangladesh
Districts of Bangladesh
Divisions of Bangladesh

References

External links
 Gopalpur Upazila Parishad

 
Upazilas of Tangail District